Robson Green's Wild Swimming Adventure is a show featuring Robson Green which airs in December 2009. Robson Green undertakes an aquatic journey through the wild waters of Britain in this new two-part documentary series for ITV.

Episodes

External links
Official Site

ITV (TV network) original programming